Ng Joo Pong (born 19 June 1946) is a Malaysian cyclist who represented Malaysia at the 1964 and 1968 Summer Olympics and the 1966 Asian Games.

His greatest success at a major international was when he was 19 and was chosen to represent Malaysia at the 1966 Asian Games in Bangkok where he won the individual gold medal in the long-distance cycling competition. It was a surprise for the Asian cycling community as virtually no one, not even his teammates, expected Malaysia to win any medals given Japan's long term domination of the sport in Asia.  As it turned out, cycling was a highlight for Malaysia at the 1966 Asian Games. In addition to Ng's gold, his brother also won a gold medal, and so did another cyclist, Daud Ibrahim, who won a gold medal in the 1,600m cycling event.

References

1946 births
Living people
Malaysian male cyclists
Olympic cyclists of Malaysia
Cyclists at the 1964 Summer Olympics
Cyclists at the 1968 Summer Olympics
Sportspeople from Kuala Lumpur
Asian Games medalists in cycling
Cyclists at the 1966 Asian Games
Cyclists at the 1970 Asian Games
Medalists at the 1970 Asian Games
Asian Games bronze medalists for Malaysia
20th-century Malaysian people
21st-century Malaysian people